State Trunk Highway 30 (often called Highway 30, STH-30 or WIS 30) is a state highway in the U.S. state of Wisconsin. It runs east–west in suburban Madison as a connector freeway between Interstate 39, Interstate 90, and Interstate 94 at the Badger Interchange to US 151 east of Downtown Madison.  This section is all that remains of the highway that stood as of 1964 after I-94 was commissioned.  This is the second alignment of the route number - the first beginning in Platteville and ending in Readstown.

Route description

WIS 30 is a freeway for its entire length and lies completely within the city of Madison.  It junctions with US 151 at a folded diamond interchange.  West of the terminus, the road becomes Aberg Avenue which provides a shortcut to WIS 113 north. WIS 30 has three interchanges between termini: one at Fair Oaks Avenue, one at Stoughton Road (US 51) and a half-diamond at North Thompson Drive (CTH-T).  The Thompson Drive interchange features roundabouts at the ramp junctions with the crossing street.  WIS 30 ends at its junction with Interstates 39, 90 and 94 at what is commonly known as the Badger Interchange.  The interchanges are numbered sequentially from west to east.

History
From 1924 until the completion of I-94 between Madison and Milwaukee, WIS 30 ran from the Wisconsin state capitol to Wisconsin Avenue in downtown Milwaukee, along with WIS 19. The route of WIS 30 had several different alignments during that time, all which generally parallel the current routing of I-94.

WIS 30 was the main route between the two largest cities in the state until I-94's completion in the late 1960s.

Exit list

See also

References

External links

030
Transportation in Dane County, Wisconsin
Transportation in Madison, Wisconsin
 Freeways in the United States